Wrestling at the Islamic Solidarity Games has been contested at 2010(Cancelled) and 2017 edition of the event. The sport is expected to be contested at the upcoming 2022 Islamic Solidarity Games in Konya, Turkey.

Editions

Medal table 
Updated after the 2021 Islamic Solidarity Games

References

 
Islamic Solidarity Games